Garden features are physical elements, both natural and manmade, used in garden design.

Artificial waterfall
Avenue
Aviary
Bog garden
Borrowed scenery 
Bosquet
Broderie
Belvedere
Chashitsu (tea house)
Chōzubachi (basin)
Deck
Dirty kitchen
Exedra
Fish pond
Folly
Footbridge
Fountain
Garden pond
Garden railway
Garden room
Gazebo
Gloriette
Greenhouse
Green wall
Grotto
Shell grotto
Ha-ha 
Hedge
Hedge maze
Herbaceous border
Herb garden
Jeux d'eau
Kitchen garden
Knot garden
Koi pond
Lawn
Tapestry lawn
Moss lawn
Monopteros
Moon bridge
Moon gate
Mound
Nine-turn bridge
Nymphaeum
Orangery
Pagoda
Parterre
Patio
Pavilion
Pergola
Reflecting pool
Rockery
Scandinavian grillhouse
Scholar's rock
Stepping stones
Stumpery
Sylvan theater
Summerhouse
Terrace
Topiary
Tōrō (lantern)
Trellis
Turf maze
Water feature
Water garden
Woodland garden
Zig-zag bridge

Gallery

See also
 Eyecatchers
 Garden ornament
 Lawn ornament
 :Category:Types of garden
 :Category:Garden ornaments

 
Garden features
Garden features
Gardening aids